Alan Lai Nin GBS, JP (born 3 June 1951) is a Hong Kong politician and civil servant who served as the Director-General of the Trade and Industry Department from 1996 to 1999, Commissioner of the Independent Commission Against Corruption from 1999 to 2002 and the Ombudsman of the Office of the Ombudsman from 2009 until his retirement in 2014. He is now a consultant with the Independent Police Complaints Council.

In 2015, Lai was appointed as Commissioner of the Inquiry into the incidents of excess lead found in drinking water.

Awards
2003: Gold Bauhinia Star
2009: Justice of the Peace

References

Place of birth missing (living people)
Government officials of Hong Kong
Hong Kong politicians
Living people
Recipients of the Gold Bauhinia Star
Alumni of the University of Hong Kong
Alumni of St. John's College, University of Hong Kong
1951 births